Storeide is a surname. Notable people with the surname include:

Hjalmar Olai Storeide (1901–1961), Norwegian politician 
Kjell A. Storeide (born 1952), Norwegian businessman